The 2018–19 season was Aston Villa's third consecutive season in the Championship following their relegation from the Premier League during the 2015–16 season, they finished in fifth place and were the winners of the subsequent play-offs to achieve promotion to the Premier League. It was also their 144th year in existence.

On 2 October 2018, Villa surrendered a two-goal lead, drawing 3–3 at home to bottom club Preston North End. One spectator threw a cabbage at manager, Steve Bruce, and there were calls from home fans on the Holte End for Bruce to go. The following day, he was sacked by Villa after a poor run of form.
A week later, Dean Smith was appointed manager with the club in 15th place, with John Terry as his assistant coach.

Smith was named as the EFL's manager of the week after overseeing a 3–0 win at Derby County on 10 November. He immediately managed to reinvigorate the "Villans" attack, and only a controversial injury-time equaliser from local rivals West Bromwich Albion at The Hawthorns denied them a place in the play-offs by 7 December. However Villa's form dipped dramatically in the three months after Jack Grealish was sidelined with a shin injury picked up in that match, but on 2 March, Smith gave Grealish the captaincy on his return to the first-team and the 23-year old inspired an important 4–0 victory over play-off rivals Derby County. Smith was given that month's EFL Championship Manager of the Month award after achieving five wins in five games, including a victory over Second City derby rivals Birmingham City.

On 22 April 2019, the team surpassed a 109 year old club record for longest winning run after defeating Millwall 1–0 at Villa Park to make it 10 successive victories in 10 matches. The record had previously been held at nine straight wins. On 11 May, the new manager oversaw his 18th win with Aston Villa as they came from behind to beat West Brom 2–1 in the first leg of the Championship play-off semi-finals. Three days later, Villa came from behind at West Brom to win on penalties and secure a place in the play-off final. Villa went on to win promotion to the Premier League with a 2–1 victory over Derby County.

Competitions

Pre-season friendlies
Villa announced friendlies with AFC Telford United, Kidderminster Harriers, Walsall and Dynamo Dresden.

Championship

League table

Results by matchday

Result summary

Matches
On 21 June 2018, the Championship fixtures for the forthcoming season were announced.

Playoffs
On 22 April 2019, Aston Villa confirmed their place in this year's EFL Championship playoffs.
On 30 April 2019, Aston Villa confirmed 5th place in this year's Championship and would therefore play their first leg at home. The date is set for Saturday 11 May 2019 at 12:30pm.

FA Cup

The third round draw was made live on BBC by Ruud Gullit and Paul Ince from Stamford Bridge on 3 December 2018.

EFL Cup

On 15 June 2018, the draw for the first round was made in Vietnam. The second round was drawn by Chris Waddle and Mick McCarthy on 16 August 2018.

Transfers

Transfers in

Transfers out

Loans in

Loans out

Squad statistics

Appearances and goals

|-
! colspan=14 style=background:#dcdcdc; text-align:center| Goalkeepers

|-
! colspan=14 style=background:#dcdcdc; text-align:center| Defenders

|-
! colspan=14 style=background:#dcdcdc; text-align:center| Midfielders

|-
! colspan=14 style=background:#dcdcdc; text-align:center| Forwards

|-
! colspan=14 style=background:#dcdcdc; text-align:center| Players transferred or loaned out during the season

|-
|}

 Given one Red Card, which was later rescinded.

Based on matches played until 28 May 2019

Based on matches played until 28 May 2019

References

Aston Villa
Aston Villa F.C. seasons